In the Midst of My Days (U sredini mojih dana) is a 1988 Croatian film directed by Jakov Sedlar.

Sources
 U sredini mojih dana at hrfilm.hr

External links
 

1988 films
Croatian drama films
1980s Croatian-language films
Yugoslav drama films
Films about Catholicism
Films set in Bosnia and Herzegovina
1988 directorial debut films
Films directed by Jakov Sedlar